U.S.A. Still United is the second remix album by Atlanta-based rap duo Ying Yang Twins. The summer hit, "Wait (The Whisper Song)", is featured here in its remix version, as is the remix of the follow-up "Shake" with labelmate Pitbull and dancehall superstar Elephant Man. Also included is the most recent single "Bedroom Boom" featuring Avant, plus five previously unreleased songs.

Track listings

CD
 "Mr. Collipark's (Intro)" - 0:52
 "Wiggle Then Move" - 4:34
 "Ms. New Booty" (Bubba Sparxxx featuring Ying Yang Twins & Mr. Collipark) - 4:38
 "Git It" (Bun B featuring Ying Yang Twins) - 3:57
 "Get Yern" (Da Muzicianz featuring D-Roc of the Ying Yang Twins) - 3:37
 "The Pink" - 4:10
 "4 Oz." (featuring Three 6 Mafia) - 5:54
 "Legendary Status" (Homebwoi featuring Kadalack Boyz) - 4:23
 "Bedroom Boom" (featuring Avant) - 4:36
 "Duts" - 2:07
 "Wait (The Whisper Song) [Ultimix Remix]" - 5:42
 "Shake [Remix]" (featuring Pitbull & Elephant Man) - 4:21

DVD
 "Wait (The Whisper Song)"
 "Badd" (featuring Mike Jones)
 "Shake" (featuring Pitbull)
 90 min. of behind the scenes footage, live performances, and interviews

Charts

Weekly charts

Year-end charts

References

Ying Yang Twins albums
Albums produced by Mr. Collipark
2005 remix albums
TVT Records remix albums